Argentan Abbey otherwise Notre-Dame de la Place (Abbaye Notre-Dame de la Place) is an 11th-century Benedictine abbey in Argentan, France. It is now a restaurant.

A community of nuns transferred here from Almenêches Abbey in 1736 but were dispersed during the French Revolution. They reassembled at Vimoutiers in 1822 and finally returned to Argentan in 1830. As a result of fighting during World War II, the nuns were forced to flee to Sées from 1944 to 1958.

See also
List of Benedictine monasteries in France

References

The Benedictine Nuns of the Abbey of St. Cécile de Solesmes sing the Agnus Dei

Benedictine monasteries in France
Buildings and structures in Orne